The 1992–93 OHL season was the 13th season of the Ontario Hockey League. The Cornwall Royals become the Newmarket Royals. The Detroit Compuware Ambassadors are renamed the Detroit Junior Red Wings. The inaugural OHL Humanitarian of the Year is awarded. Sixteen teams each played 66 games. The Peterborough Petes won the J. Ross Robertson Cup, defeating the Sault Ste. Marie Greyhounds.

Relocation and Rebranding

Cornwall Royals to Newmarket Royals

The Cornwall Royals relocated to the city of Newmarket, Ontario and were named the Newmarket Royals. The team would play at the Newmarket Recreational Complex.

The club was established in 1969 in the Quebec Major Junior Hockey League, as Cornwall won the Memorial Cup three times, in 1972, 1980 and 1981. Prior to the 1981-82, the Royals transferred to the Ontario Hockey League. After joining the OHL, the club was made the post-season in ten of their eleven seasons.

Newmarket would remain in the Leyden Division following the relocation.

Detroit Compuware Ambassadors to Detroit Junior Red Wings

The Detroit Compuware Ambassadors rebranded their team into the Detroit Junior Red Wings. The Junior Red Wings would continue to share Joe Louis Arena with the Detroit Red Wings of the National Hockey League.

The club would use the familiar Red Wings logo and change their colours to red and white to match the NHL team.

Regular season

Final standings
Note: DIV = Division; GP = Games played; W = Wins; L = Losses; T = Ties; GF = Goals for; GA = Goals against; PTS = Points; x = clinched playoff berth; y = clinched division title

Leyden Division

Emms Division

Scoring leaders

Playoffs

OHL Superseries
The winner of the OHL Superseries will host the 1993 Memorial Cup. This series featured the top ranked team in the Leyden Division, the Peterborough Petes, take on the top ranked team in the Emms Division, the Sault Ste. Marie Greyhounds.

(L1) Peterborough Petes vs. (E1) Sault Ste. Marie Greyhounds

Division quarter-finals

Leyden Division

(2) Kingston Frontenacs vs. (7) North Bay Centennials

(3) Oshawa Generals vs. (6) Belleville Bulls

(4) Sudbury Wolves vs. (5) Newmarket Royals

Emms Division

(2) Detroit Junior Red Wings vs. (7) Guelph Storm

(3) London Knights vs. (6) Kitchener Rangers

(4) Owen Sound Platers vs. (5) Niagara Falls Thunder

Division semi-finals

Leyden Division

(1) Peterborough Petes vs. (4) Sudbury Wolves

(2) Kingston Frontenacs vs. (3) Oshawa Generals

Emms Division

(1) Sault Ste. Marie Greyhounds vs. (4) Owen Sound Platers

(2) Detroit Junior Red Wings vs. (3) London Knights

Division finals

Leyden Division

(1) Peterborough Petes vs. (2) Kingston Frontenacs

Emms Division

(1) Sault Ste. Marie Greyhounds vs. (2) Detroit Junior Red Wings

J. Ross Robertson Cup

(L1) Peterborough Petes vs. (E1) Sault Ste. Marie Greyhounds

Awards

All-star teams
The OHL All-star teams were selected by the OHL's general managers.

First team
Pat Peake, Centre, Detroit Jr. Red Wings
Andrew Brunette, Left Wing, Owen Sound Platers
Jason Dawe, Right Wing, Peterborough Petes
Chris Pronger, Defence, Peterborough Petes
Mark DeSantis, Defence, Newmarket Royals
Manny Legace, Goaltender, Niagara Falls Thunder
Gary Agnew, Coach, London Knights

Second team
Mike Harding, Centre, Peterborough Petes
Bob Wren, Left Wing, Detroit Jr. Red Wings
Kevin Brown, Right Wing, Detroit Jr. Red Wings
Brent Tully, Defence, Peterborough Petes
Scott Walker, Defence, Owen Sound Platers
Chad Lang, Goaltender, Peterborough Petes
Rick Cornacchia, Coach, Oshawa Generals

Third team
Chris Gratton, Centre, Kingston Frontenacs
Jeff Shevalier, Left Wing, North Bay Centennials
Scott Hollis, Right Wing, Oshawa Generals
Blair Scott, Defence, Detroit Jr. Red Wings
Nick Stajduhar, Defence, London Knights
Marc Lamothe, Goaltender, Kingston Frontenacs
Dick Todd, Coach, Peterborough Petes

1993 OHL Priority Selection
The Ottawa 67's held the first overall pick in the 1993 Ontario Priority Selection and selected Alyn McCauley from the Kingston Voyageurs. McCauley was awarded the Jack Ferguson Award, awarded to the top pick in the draft.

Below are the players who were selected in the first round of the 1993 Ontario Hockey League Priority Selection.

See also
List of OHA Junior A standings
List of OHL seasons
1993 Memorial Cup
1993 NHL Entry Draft
1992 in sports
1993 in sports

References

HockeyDB

Ontario Hockey League seasons
OHL